Echopark Guitars is an American guitar and bass manufacturer which started in Echo Park, Los Angeles, CA. Now located in Detroit, Michigan, the instruments are made by Gabriel Currie, who previously worked for G&L Musical Instruments and Tak Hosono at Hosono Guitar Works before starting Echopark Guitars. Echopark players include Joe Perry and Bradley Whitford of Aersomith, Josh Homme of Queens of the Stone Age, actor Johnny Depp, and the German guitarist Azhar Kamal. A limited number of Echopark guitars are produced each year. Currie utilizes aged and in some cases, ancient woods in the production of the instruments.

References

External links
 Detroit Business News, "Detroit’s Echopark Guitars Signs Multi-year Collaboration Agreement with Gibson"
"With or without Gibson, Detroit guitarmaker strikes chord with musicians", Detroit News
Detroit Metro Times, "How Echopark guitars moved from the West Coast to set up shop in Detroit"
Guitar-Connoisseur magazine, "Echo Park Guitars"

Guitar manufacturing companies of the United States